William Jennings "Bill" Capell (born 9 August 1952), a retired grocery clerk from Yuba City, California, is the heir presumptive to the Earldom of Essex. He will become the 12th earl if the current earl, Paul Capell, 11th Earl of Essex (currently  and unmarried), predeceases him without in-wedlock male issue.

Claim 
Capell had considered renouncing the earldom if it would require him to give up his United States citizenship (under the United Kingdom's Peerage Act 1963, a person may disclaim a hereditary peerage). U.S. law requires only government officeholders without congressional authorization and persons wishing to become naturalized citizens, however, to renounce titles of nobility. As Capell is in neither category, there would be no legal impediment to his use of the title as a U.S. citizen; indeed there is precedent in the case of the Earl of Wharncliffe, currently a Maine construction worker.

Like the sixth and later earls, Capell is descended from the younger son of the fourth Earl. His father, Bladen Horace Capell, claimed the title after the ninth earl died in 1981, but Robert de Vere Capell (1920–2005) eventually proved that his ancestor, Algernon, was older than Bladen's ancestor Adolphus and thus took his seat in the House of Lords in 1989.

Personal life 
Capell has two children:
 Jennifer Elaine Capell (b. 1974), married Alfred Cabrera in 2004
 Kevin Devereux Capell (b. 1982)

If Capell succeeds to the earldom, his son will acquire the courtesy title Viscount Malden, and his daughter will become Lady Jennifer Cabrera.

In 2005, Capell made his first visit to England with his wife, daughter, and son-in-law. The visit was televised on the tabloid show Inside Edition.

Family tree

Recent relations

References

External links
[All dead links]
RootsWeb: CORNELL-L Archives - Sometimes knowing your roots can be very rewarding!! ("reprint" of Los Angeles Times article)
The International Wenches Guild: Grocery clerk possible Earl of Essex
Kitsap Sun: (Editor's Choice) Average Joe May Move Into House of Lords
The Moscow Times: Aristocracy Thrives in Yuba City

1953 births
20th-century American people
21st-century American people
William Jennings
People from Yuba City, California
Living people
American people of British descent